Erik Sowinski (born December 21, 1989) is an American middle-distance runner. He competed in the 800 metres event at the 2014 IAAF World Indoor Championships and 2015 World Championships.  He holds the former American indoor record in the 600 meters.

Early life
Sowinski was born on December 21, 1989 in Waukesha, WI to Bryan and Jane Sowinski. He has two younger siblings, Andy and Emily.   Running for Waukesha West High School, Erik won the 800m at the 2008 WIAA Wisconsin State Meet.

Running career

Collegiate
Sowinski attended and ran for University of Iowa up until his graduation in 2012. He set his school's 800-meter record at 1:45.90 when he placed second overall at the 2012 NCAA Division I Outdoor Track and Field Championships. Additionally, Sowinski accumulated five All-American titles while at University of Iowa.

Post-collegiate
Following college, he joined the Iowa City running store sponsored Running Wild, where he is coached by World Championship medalist Joey Woody.  During the indoor season of 2013, he entered the Millrose Games 600 metres, where he was expected to be an also-ran behind the more notable Olympians Duane Solomon and Nick Symmonds, who were expecting to chase the American record.  Strategically following Duane and the unrelated Jarrin Solomon into the final turn, Sowinski then launched one powerful sprint to the finish, not only winning the prestigious race, but taking the American record in 1:15.61.  Three weeks later, he won the 800 metres at the USA Indoor Track and Field Championships, winning in 1:47.09 ahead of a late charge by Robby Andrews.  He signed with Nike in May.  He still works for the running store.

In 2014 he repeated as national indoor champion, which qualified him to represent the United States internationally at the 2014 IAAF World Indoor Championships in Sopot, Poland where he placed 13th.

At 2016 Shanghai Diamond League, Erik Sowinski placed 8th in tactical race.

In 2017, he won the gold medal in the men's 4 × 800 metres relay at the 2017 IAAF World Relays held in Nassau, Bahamas. In 2019, Sowinski was also a part of the pacing effort, along with Christian Harrison and Harun Abda, which led to Yomif Kejelcha breaking the Indoor Mile World Record.  

In 2020, Sowinski switched sponsors from Nike to Brooks where he competed as a member of the Brooks Beasts but while maintaining his residence in Iowa City, IA. He placed 4th at the USATF Indoor Championships before the outdoor season was cancelled due to COVID-19. In 2022, Sowinski continued his sponsorship with Bell Lap Elite. On February 17, 2022, Erik paced Olympic Champion Jakob Ingebrigtsen to a new Indoor World Record of 3:30.60.

Achievements

References

1989 births
Living people
American male middle-distance runners
World Athletics Championships athletes for the United States
World Athletics Championships medalists
Sportspeople from Iowa
Sportspeople from Iowa City, Iowa
Sportspeople from Waukesha, Wisconsin
World Athletics indoor record holders (relay)
USA Indoor Track and Field Championships winners